Microstelma vestale is a species of minute sea snail, a marine gastropod mollusk or micromollusk in the family Zebinidae.

Distribution and habitat
It occurs in the Gulf of Mexico,  with a minimum recorded depth of 33 m and a maximum recorded depth of 107 m.

Description 
The maximum recorded shell length is 10.8 mm.

References

Zebinidae
Gastropods described in 1943